The 1976–77 season was Colchester United's 35th season in their history and first season back in fourth tier of English football, the Fourth Division following relegation the previous season. Alongside competing in the Fourth Division, the club also participated in the FA Cup and the League Cup.

Colchester bounced back to the Third Division at the first attempt under Bobby Roberts with a largely unchanged team from the previous season. He led them to a third-place finish in the league, while in the FA Cup, Colchester took First Division Derby County to a replay in the fourth round. In the League Cup, it took Second Division Millwall three attempts to dispatch the U's in a replay following the initial two legs.

Season overview
Colchester made an instant return to the Third Division after the board kept the faith in manager Bobby Roberts. The season began strongly with twelve successive home victories. Despite a first round League Cup defeat to Millwall, an impressive FA Cup run saw the U's lose out in the fourth round to First Division Derby County in a replay at the Baseball Ground. Over 14,000 fans had seen Colin Garwood equalise in the seventh minute of injury time in the first match at Layer Road.

A settled side aided Colchester's progress across the season. Eight players played over 40 of the 46 league games. The two favoured forwards of Bobby Gough and Colin Garwood registered 17 and 16 goals respectively, while centre-half Steve Dowman scored twelve goals in his debut season. Colchester were promoted in third position behind only Cambridge United and Exeter City.

Players

Transfers

In

 Total spending:  ~ £0

Out

 Total incoming:  ~ £0

Loans in

Match details

Fourth Division

Results round by round

League table

Matches

League Cup

FA Cup

Squad statistics

Appearances and goals

|-
!colspan="14"|Players who appeared for Colchester who left during the season

|}

Goalscorers

Disciplinary record

Clean sheets
Number of games goalkeepers kept a clean sheet.

Player debuts
Players making their first-team Colchester United debut in a fully competitive match.

See also
List of Colchester United F.C. seasons

References

General
Books

Websites

Specific

1976-77
English football clubs 1976–77 season